Skrunda Municipality was a municipality in Courland, Latvia. The municipality was formed in 2009 by merging Skrunda town with its countryside territory, Raņķi parish, Nīkrāce parish and Rudbārži parish; the administrative centre being Skrunda. The population in 2020 was 4,543.

On 1 July 2021, Skrunda Municipality ceased to exist and its territory was merged into Kuldīga Municipality.

See also 
 Administrative divisions of Latvia (2009)

References 

 
Former municipalities of Latvia